Communauté d'agglomération Royan Atlantique is the communauté d'agglomération, an intercommunal structure, centred on the town of Royan. It is located in the Charente-Maritime department, in the Nouvelle-Aquitaine region, southwestern France. Created in 2001, its seat is in Royan. Its area is 603.9 km2. Its population was 83,661 in 2019, of which 18,419 in Royan proper.

Composition
The communauté d'agglomération consists of the following 33 communes:

Arces
Arvert
Barzan
Boutenac-Touvent
Breuillet
Brie-sous-Mortagne
Chaillevette
Le Chay
Chenac-Saint-Seurin-d'Uzet
Corme-Écluse
Cozes
L'Éguille
Épargnes
Étaules
Floirac
Grézac
Les Mathes
Médis
Meschers-sur-Gironde
Mornac-sur-Seudre
Mortagne-sur-Gironde
Royan
Sablonceaux
Saint-Augustin
Saint-Georges-de-Didonne
Saint-Palais-sur-Mer
Saint-Romain-de-Benet
Saint-Sulpice-de-Royan
Saujon
Semussac
Talmont-sur-Gironde
La Tremblade
Vaux-sur-Mer

References

Saintes
Saintes